Spargo are a Dutch band, formed in 1975, known for their hits "You and Me", "Head Up to the Sky", "One Night Affair", "Just For You" and "Hip Hap Hop" in the 1980s.

Career 
Spargo was formed by Mulder, Elbersen (both of whom had played in the blues rock group Space 7), Driessen, Nassenstein and Lammertink. The band was initially called Funkliefhebber Lammertink. Elbersen left the band and in 1979 American singer Lilian Day Jackson, stepdaughter of jazz drummer Art Blakley, joined. With Jackson and Driessen as lead vocalists, the band got its distinctive sound and got its breakthrough. In 1980, the single "You and Me" topped the charts in the Netherlands and also became the best-selling record there in 1980. The single was also very successful across Europe, in Belgium, Germany, Iceland and Sweden. Between August 1980 and March 1982, Spargo achieved four more top-5 hits in the Netherlands, but the success of "You and Me" was not to be equalled.

Between October 1982 and March 1984, the band achieved a further 4 top-40 hits, but none were as successful as their previous singles.

Jackson and Lammertink quit the band at the end of 1983. The drummer was replaced by René van Collem, previously in Doe Maar, and a new album Step by Step was recorded. The first single, "Lady", was the band's last hit single until 1997. After becoming less successful and their music having apparently fallen out of favour, the band called it quits in 1985.

Reunions 
In 1997, the band reformed with Jackson's brother Larry joined the line-up on percussion, in order to record a new single "Indestructible" for a compilation CD. The band also recorded another song "Make a New Start", which was also included on the compilation. This was followed by live and television performances, including a one-off broadcast of TopPop.

At the end of 2015, the band, joined by Larry Jackson and Driessen's son Joao (on saxophone and keyboards) gave a full line-up mini-concert during Humberto Tan's Let's Dance event in a sold-out Ziggo-Dome in Amsterdam.

In June 2017, the band performed at the 40-UP Festivals at the Red Light Jazz festival in Amsterdam.

In 2018, Driessen's daughter Jazzi Bobbi remixed the band's biggest hit "You and Me" which was featured in a Vodafone TV advert.

Members

Current members 
 Ruud Mulder – guitar, vocals
 Ellert Driessen – lead vocals, keyboards
 Gerald Olieberg – bass
 Leander Lammertink – drums
 Lilian Day Jackson – lead vocals, percussion

Past members 
 Hans Elbersen – guitar, vocals
 René van Collem – drums
 Jef Nassenstein – bass, vocals

Discography

Albums 
 Good Time Spirit (1980) – NL #17
 Go (1981) – NL #14
 Hold On (1982)
 Step by Step (1984)
 Best of Spargo (1990)
 Indestructible – The Singles Collection (1997) – NL #27
 Just for Me and You – The Greatest Hits Collection (2019)

Singles

References 

Musical groups established in 1975
Dutch pop music groups
Dutch disco groups
Dutch funk musical groups